Stockport power station supplied electricity to the town of Stockport, Cheshire and the surrounding area from 1899 to 1976. The power station was owned and operated by Stockport Corporation prior to the nationalisation of the British electricity supply industry in 1948. It was redeveloped several times to meet the increased demand for electricity.

History
In 1891 Stockport Corporation applied for a Provisional Order under the Electric Lighting Acts to generate and supply electricity to the town. This was granted by the Board of Trade and was confirmed by Parliament through the Electric Lighting Orders Confirmation (No. 2) Act 1891 (44 & 45 Vict. c. l). The power station was built in Millgate, Stockport (53°24’44”N, 2°09’15”W) and it first supplied electricity in 1899. Further equipment was added to meet the rising demand for electricity; by 1922  it had a generating capacity of 22,000 kW.

From the establishment of the Stockport Corporation Tramways in 1901 the power station supplied electric current to tram system. The trams were decommissioned in 1951.

Stockport power station became a selected station in the North West England and North Wales Electricity Scheme. It was part of one of three national grid rings in the northwest. Other stations in the Stockport ring were Manchester, Tame Valley and Oldham.

The British electricity supply industry was nationalised in 1948 under the provisions of the Electricity Act 1947 (10 & 11 Geo. 6 c. 54). The Stockport electricity undertaking was abolished, ownership of Stockport power station was vested in the British Electricity Authority, and subsequently the Central Electricity Authority and the Central Electricity Generating Board (CEGB). At the same time the electricity distribution and sales responsibilities of the Stockport electricity undertaking were transferred to the North Western Electricity Board (NORWEB).

Stockport power station was closed on 25 October 1976. The power station was subsequently demolished.

Stockport Hydro is a hydro-electric generating station located at Otterspool Weir on the River Goyt at Marple, Stockport. It comprises two Archimedes screws with a total output of 68 kW. It was commissioned in October 2012 and in its first year generated 180 MWh of electricity which was fed into the national grid.

Equipment specification
By 1923 the plant comprised boilers delivering 288,000 lb/h (36.3 kg/s) of steam to:

 3 × 5,000 kW steam turbo-alternators AC
 1 × 5,500 kW steam turbo-alternator AC
 3 × 500 kW reciprocating engines with DC generator

These machines gave a total generating capacity of 22,000 kW comprising 20,500 kW of alternating current (AC) plus 1,500 kW of direct current (DC).

The following electricity supplies were available to consumers:

 400 & 230 Volts, 3-phase, 50 Hz AC
 460 & 230 Volts DC
 500 V DC Traction current

Plant in 1954
By 1954 the plant comprised:

 Boilers:
 1 × Babcock & Wilcox 20,000 lb/h (2.52 kg/s) boiler, steam conditions were 220 psi and 650 °F (15.2 bar and 343 °C),
 1 × Babcock & Wilcox 25,000 lb/h (3.15 kg/s) boiler, steam conditions as above,
 1 × Babcock & Wilcox 40,000 lb/h (5.04 kg/s) boiler, steam conditions as above,
 3 × Simon Carves 150,000 lb/h (18.9 kg/s) boilers, steam conditions were 425 psi and 825 °F (29.3 bar and 441 °C),
 1 × Simon Carves 300,000 lb/h (37.8 kg/s) boiler, steam conditions were 625 psi and 850 °F (43.1 bar and 454 °C). This was one of the UK's earliest unit boilers dedicated to a 30 MW turbo-alternator.

There was a total steam raising capability of 835,000 lb/h (105.2 kg/s); steam was supplied to:

 Generators:
 1 × 12.5 MW English Electric turbo-alternator (installed 1926)
 1 × 20 MW Escher Wyss turbo-alternator (installed 1931)
 1 × 30 MW Fraser & Chalmers turbo-alternator (installed 1940)
 1 × 30 MW Richardson Westgarth turbo-alternator (installed 1943)

The total generating capacity was 92.5 MW at 6.6 kV.

Condenser cooling water was drawn from the nearby River Goyt and there were three cooling towers, with a capacity of 2.8 million gallons per hour (3.53 m3/s).

Operations

Operating data 1921–23
The electricity supply data for the period 1921–23 was:

The electricity Loads on the system were:

Revenue from the sale of current (in 1923) was £139,950; the surplus of revenue over expenses was £69,638.

Operating data 1946
In 1946 Stockport power station supplied 241,693 MWh of electricity, the maximum output load was 72,580 kW. The load factor was 39.8%, and the thermal efficiency was 21.67%.

Operating data 1954–72
Operating data for the period 1954–72 was:

The output of Stockport power station in MWh was as follows:

Stockport Electricity District
Following nationalisation Stockport power station became part of the Stockport electricity supply district, covering 19 square miles (49.2 km2) with a population of 159,000 in 1958. The number of consumers and electricity sold in the Stockport district was:

In 1958 the number of units sold to categories of consumers was:

The maximum demand was 65,700 kW, the load factor was 35.3%.

See also
 Timeline of the UK electricity supply industry
 List of power stations in England

References

Demolished power stations in the United Kingdom
Coal-fired power stations in England